The Governor of Galway was a military officer who commanded the garrison at Galway in the west of Ireland. The post became a sinecure and in 1833 was to be abolished from the next vacancy.

List of governors

 1616: Richard Burke, 4th Earl of Clanricarde (died 1635)
 Ulick Burke, 1st Marquess of Clanricarde (died 1657)
 Henry de Burgh
 1651: General Preston (fled to France, 1651)
 1652: Colonel Peter Stubbers (for Parliament)
 1655: Colonel Thomas Sadleir
 –1691: Henry Dillon, 8th Viscount Dillon
 1691: Sir Henry Belasyse
 John Eyre
 1712: Michael Burke, 10th Earl of Clanricarde
 1714: John Ussher
 1718: George St George, 1st Baron St George
 1747–: Stratford Eyre (died 1765)
 1768–1793: Robert Sandford
 1793–1825: Peter Daly
 1826–1839: Sir John Elley

References

Politics of Galway (city)
Galway
1839 disestablishments in the United Kingdom